Back Fork is a 2019 American drama film directed by Josh Stewart, starring Josh Stewart, A. J. Cook, Agnes Bruckner, Wade Williams and Dorothy Lyman.

Cast
 Josh Stewart as Waylon
 A. J. Cook as Nida
 Agnes Bruckner as Rayleen
 Wade Williams as Bill
 Dorothy Lyman as Susie

Release
The film was released on 5 April 2019.

Reception
Frank Scheck of The Hollywood Reporter praised Stewart's performance and wrote that while the film "doesn’t break any new ground either in terms of substance or style", it "packs a quiet punch".

Katie Walsh of the Los Angeles Times called the film "hushed, poetic and intimate", despite the fact that "we never get a sense of the characters’ true anguish and pain".

References

External links
 
 

American drama films
2019 drama films